Bardia Saadat (born August 12, 2002 in Urmia) is an Iranian volleyball player who plays as an opposite spiker for the Iran national team and Italian club Top Volley Cisterna.

In 2021 Saadat invited to Iran senior national team by Vladimir Alekno and made his debut match against Russia in the 2021 Nations League.

Honours

National team
U21 World Championship
Gold medal (1): 2019
Asian U18 Championship
Bronze medal (1): 2018

Individual
Best Opposite Spiker: 2018 Asian Boys' U18 Championship

References

External links
Bardia Saadat at Volleybox.net
Bardia Saadat at Volleyballworld.com
Bardia Saadat at Worldofvolley
Bardia Saadat at Mvolley.com

2002 births
Living people
Iranian men's volleyball players
People from Urmia
Iranian expatriate sportspeople in Serbia
21st-century Iranian people